Big Eggo was a British comic strip series about an eponymous ostrich, published in the British comic magazine The Beano. He first appeared in issue 1, dated 30 July 1938, and was the first ever cover star. His first words in the strip were "Somebody's taken my egg again!". It was drawn throughout by Reg Carter.

Background
When creating a new comic in his "big five" series, R. D. Low wrote a newspaper advert in The Daily Telegraph for new artists. He was certain that his new character would be a black-and-white animal which would stand out in a colourful world; an idea he similarly used for Korky the Cat in The Dandy. Reg Carter (who had originally published Mickey Mouse comics throughout the 1930s) responded in January 1938 with a few ideas and sketches. Carter and Low's eventual idea would be an ostrich that misplaced his eggs. In an exchange of letters, they planned to name him Oswald the Ostrich, but eventual editor George Moonie suggested the name should be changed to Big Eggo. The ostrich became the first front cover star of the comic until he was replaced in 1948 by Biffo the Bear.

Common plots
The majority of Eggo's tales were about him looking for an egg he had misplaced, which would lead to a situation in which he would either discover that the egg was not an ostrich egg; in one story, he stole an egg from a zoo and a penguin hatched out and another was about a monkey stealing his egg and replacing it with a crocodile egg. Although a male bird, it has never been explained why Eggo is obsessed with eggs or whether he could lay eggs like a hen; however, this could have been intentional to make the stories absurdly amusing.

Other stories would have him in a wacky situation, such as eating an alarm clock which alerts a fire station he walks past, or another where Eggo is caught in a hot air balloon after trying to stop a goat from eating the anchor rope. In some stories, he was also a zookeeper, and there were the stories in which he would be acting anthropromorphic, such as dog sledding, shopping, or walking pigs on a lead as if they were his pets.

Declining appearances
When Biffo the Bear took over as the cover star, Big Eggo would appear on the front cover's masthead, but would appear inside The Beano with the other comics, such as Lord Snooty and Pansy Potter. In World War II, rationing forced comics to stop being published too frequently; The Beano would publish fortnightly until the end of the 1940s. Big Eggo, like many Beano strips, dedicated stories to encouraging young readers to help with the war effort, such as recycling paper; one story was about Big Eggo, bothered by flies, creating fly paper out of sheets covered in glue after he accidentally knocks the recycling into some glue baths. He would continue to have stories until 1949, and his front-cover masthead appearances would drop in 1954, being replaced by Dennis the Menace. The sudden disappearance of the stories was due to the death of Carter in April 1949, which was not revealed until 2008, although rumours surfaced weeks before that readers had fallen out of love with the character because he was a bird, not a mammal, and therefore did not relate to the audience, unlike Biffo, a bear. George Drysdale took over as artist for the strips after Carter's death until the series' conclusion.

Cameos
Big Eggo would begin to reappear sporadically after the character left the masthead. The next time Eggo made a cameo in the comic was for the 2000th issue celebration at the top of the cover of the first Beano reprinted on the back page, saying "Ah! The good old days!".

A one-off strip called Lord Snooty's Day Out drawn by Ken H. Harrison  reveals that he is living in the Beano Retirement Home, along with Jonah, Lord Snooty and Jack Flash. Two years later, Eggo would meet Gnasher and Gnipper for the 65th anniversary.

In 2006, Big Eggo was used as a villain for a feature-length Bash Street Kids story illustrated and written by Kev F. Sutherland. The story featured him and other discontinued Beano characters wanting to revert the magazine back to when they were popular, but the Class 2B accidentally thwart the plan with the help of The Dandy Keyhole Kate accidentally building a robot with the brain of Jonah.

He also made a surprise return to the Beano in issue 3925 in a three-panel strip for the start of a new miniseries, written and drawn by Lew Stringer, to tie in with the comic's 80th anniversary, which continued for 24 more issues until September. In one, he was joined by Blotty and 'Enry. He was also the only character from the first generation to appear on the front cover of the 2019 Beano Annual; his first story's gag was re-enacted on the back cover with Gnasher handing Walter a crocodile egg that hatches with the baby biting Walter's bottom. He appeared in the inner cover artwork with 254 other characters from The Beano's history and was in the time-travelling comic feature "Doctor Whoops!"

References

Notes

Citations

Books

External links 

1938 comics debuts
Mascots introduced in 1938
1949 comics endings
Beano strips
British comic strips
British comics characters
Comics about animals
Comics about birds
Comics characters introduced in 1938
Fictional flightless birds
Gag-a-day comics
Magazine mascots
Bird mascots
Male characters in comics
Male characters in advertising